Matteo Angioletti (born 8 November 1980) is an Italian male artistic gymnast and part of the national team.  He participated at the 2004 Summer Olympics, 2008 Summer Olympics and 2012 Summer Olympics.

References

External links

1980 births
Living people
Italian male artistic gymnasts
Olympic gymnasts of Italy
Gymnasts at the 2004 Summer Olympics
Gymnasts at the 2008 Summer Olympics
Gymnasts at the 2012 Summer Olympics
Mediterranean Games silver medalists for Italy
Mediterranean Games medalists in gymnastics
Competitors at the 2001 Mediterranean Games
21st-century Italian people